An hôtel particulier is a grand townhouse, comparable to the British townhouse or mansion. Whereas an ordinary maison (house) was built as part of a row, sharing party walls with the houses on either side and directly fronting on a street, an hôtel particulier was often free-standing and, by the 18th century, would always be located entre cour et jardin – between the cour d'honneur (an entrance court) and the garden behind. There are hôtels particuliers in many large cities in France.

Etymology and meaning

The word hôtel represents the Old French "hostel" from the Latin hospitālis "pertaining to guests", from hospes, a stranger, thus a guest. The adjective particulier means "personal" or "private". 

The English word hotel developed a more specific meaning as a commercial building accommodating travellers; modern French also uses hôtel  in this sense. For example, the Hôtel de Crillon on the Place de la Concorde was built as an hôtel particulier and is today a public hotel. 

In French, an hôtel de ville or mairie is a town hall and not a hotel. Other official bodies might give their name to the structure in which they maintained a seat: aside from Paris, several other French cities have an Hôtel de Cluny, maintained by the abbey of Cluny. The Hôtel de Sens was built as the Paris residence of the archbishop of Sens.  The Hôtel de Bourgogne in Paris was a theatre, taking its name from the former Paris residence of the Dukes of Burgundy on the site.  The Hôtel de la Marine, now a museum, took its name when it was the naval ministry building.

Hôtel-Dieu ("hostel of God") is the old name given to the principal hospital in French towns (and those in Quebec), such as the Hôtel-Dieu de Beaune. The Hôtel des Invalides in Paris retains its early sense of a hospital for war wounded.

Examples

In Aix-en-Provence

In Beaucaire

In Blois

In Bordeaux

In Paris

In Rennes

In Toulouse

In Vesoul

Gallery

See also

List of hôtels particuliers in Paris
Domus
Château
Mansion
Single-family detached home

References

Further reading
Monographs have been published on some outstanding Parisian hôtels particuliers.
The classic photographic survey, now a rare book found only in large art libraries, is the series Les Vieux Hotels de Paris by J. Vacquer, published in the teens and twenties of the 20th century, which takes Paris quarter by quarter and which illustrates many hôtels particuliers that were demolished during the 20th century.
Blanc, Olivier, Hôtels particuliers de Paris (1998)
Caylux, Odile et al. Les Hôtels particuliers d'Arles (2000)
Coquery, Natacha, L’hôtel aristocratique. Le marché du luxe à Paris au XVIIIe siècle, Paris, Publications de la Sorbonne, 1998
Courtin, Nicolas, L'Art d'habiter à Paris au XVIIe siècle : L'ameublement des hôtels particuliers, Paris, Faton, 2011
Cros, Philippe,Hôtels particuliers de France (2001)
Gady, Alexandre, Les Hôtels particuliers de Paris, du Moyen-Âge à la Belle époque, Paris, Parigramme, 2007
Naudin, Jean-Baptiste et al.,  Hôtels particuliers de Paris: Visite privée (1999).
Papillault, Remi Les hôtels particuliers du XVIe siècle à Toulouse (Serie Memoires des pays d'Oc)
Favreau, Bertrand, Une promenade dans Bordeaux, les hôtels parlementaires'', B550B, Mérignac, 2012, .

External links

 Les Vieux Hotels de Paris, Le Faubourg Saint-Germain Kenneth Franzheim II Rare Books Room, William R. Jenkins Architecture and Art Library, University of Houston Digital Library.
 Les Vieux Hotels de Paris, Le Faubourg Saint-Honoré Kenneth Franzheim II Rare Books Room, William R. Jenkins Architecture and Art Library, University of Houston Digital Library.
 Les Vieux Hotels de Paris, Le Ministère de la Marine Kenneth Franzheim II Rare Books Room, William R. Jenkins Architecture and Art Library, University of Houston Digital Library.
 Les Vieux Hotels de Paris, Le Quartier Saint-Paul Kenneth Franzheim II Rare Books Room, William R. Jenkins Architecture and Art Library, University of Houston Digital Library.
 Les Vieux Hotels de Paris, Le Temple et le Marais Kenneth Franzheim II Rare Books Room, William R. Jenkins Architecture and Art Library, University of Houston Digital Library.

House types